Christopher Binnie (born 26 January 1989, in Kingston) is a professional squash player who represents Jamaica. He reached a career-high world ranking of World No. 65 in January 2018.

In 2019, Binnie was named to Jamaica's 2019 Pan American Games team.

References

External links 

Jamaican male squash players
Trinity Bantams men's squash players
Living people
1989 births
Squash players at the 2006 Commonwealth Games
Squash players at the 2010 Commonwealth Games
Squash players at the 2014 Commonwealth Games
Squash players at the 2018 Commonwealth Games
Commonwealth Games competitors for Jamaica
Squash players at the 2019 Pan American Games
Competitors at the 2013 World Games
Pan American Games competitors for Jamaica